Placostylus eddystonensis is a species of air-breathing land snail, a pulmonate gastropod mollusk in the family Bothriembryontidae. 

Subspecies:
 Placostylus eddystonensis bavayi (Crosse & Marie, 1868)
 Placostylus eddystonensis eddystonensis (L. Pfeiffer, 1855)
 Placostylus eddystonensis savesi Crosse, 1886

Subspecies
This species is endemic to New Caledonia.

References

 Neubert, E., Chérel-Mora C. & Bouchet P. (2009). Polytypy, clines, and fragmentation: The bulimes of New Caledonia revisited (Pulmonata, Orthalicoidea, Placostylidae). In P. Grancolas (ed.), Zoologia Neocaledonica 7. Biodiversity studies in New Caledonia. Mémoires du Muséum National d'Histoire Naturelle. 198: 37-131.
 Delsaerdt, A.G.J. (2010). Land Snails on the Solomon Islands. Vol. I: Placostylidae. Ancona: L'Informatore Piceno. 132 pp., 12 pls.

External links
 Pfeiffer, L. (1855). Description of nine new species of land-shells, in the collection of H. Cuming, Esq. Proceedings of the Zoological Society of London. 23(284): 7–9

eddystonensis
Endemic fauna of New Caledonia
Gastropods described in 1855
Taxonomy articles created by Polbot